Project Kaisei (from 海星, kaisei, "ocean planet" in Japanese) is a scientific and commercial mission to study and clean up the Great Pacific Garbage Patch, a large body of floating debris trapped in the Pacific Ocean by the currents of the North Pacific Gyre. Discovered by NOAA, the patch is estimated to contain 20 times the density of floating debris compared to the global average. The project aims to study the extent and nature of the debris with a view to capturing, detoxifying, and recycling the material, and is organised by the Ocean Voyages Institute, a California-based 501c3 non-profit organisation dealing with marine preservation. The project is based in San Francisco and Hong Kong.

History
Project Kaisei was started in late 2008 by Mary Crowley, owner of Ocean Voyages, Inc., a for-profit yacht brokerage, Doug Woodring, and George Orbelian, from the San Francisco Bay Area, all with many years of ocean stewardship and activities behind them. As ocean lovers, Mary being a long time sailor, George a surfer and expert on surfboard design, and Doug with his open water swimming and paddling racing, each had different contacts and abilities to contribute to the group. With Doug living in Hong Kong, the group set up two points of operation on either side of the Pacific (San Francisco and Hong Kong) to help begin to bring all parties to the table to stem the flow of plastic and marine debris into our ocean.

Project goals
The project was launched on 19 March 2009, with plans for an initial phase of scientific study of the plastic debris in the North Pacific Gyre and feasibility study of the recovery and recycling technologies.  The goal is to bring about a global collaboration of science, technology and solutions, to help remove some of the floating waste. New catch methods for the debris are being studied, which would have low energy input and low marine life loss.  Technologies for remediation or recycling are being evaluated, to potentially create secondary products from the waste, which in turn could help subsidize a larger scale cleanup. The project has completed two expeditions, one in the summer of 2009, and one in 2010.  New data on the issue has been collected, and more research and planning needs to be done in order to understand the metrics and costs associated with a larger scale cleanup effort. Planning is now taking place for future research and expeditions to take place which would allow for the testing of new capture technologies and equipment, as well as the demonstration of some of the remediation or recycling technologies that could be used.

Initial voyage
The New Horizon, owned by the Scripps Institution of Oceanography, left San Diego on 2 August 2009 on the Scripps Environmental Accumulation of Plastic Expedition (SEAPLEX), set to last until 21 August. The SEAPLEX expedition is funded by the University of California, San Diego, the National Science Foundation with supplemental funding from the Project Kaisei. Two days later the Kaisei a smaller tall ship, owned by the Ocean Voyages Institute, departed San Francisco on 4 August, and was expected to undertake a 30-day voyage. The Kaisei was to investigate the size and concentration of the debris field, and explore retrieval methods, while the New Horizon would join her and study the effect of the debris field on marine life.

Intensive sampling
On reaching the patch,  from the Californian coast, New Horizon began intensive sampling on 9 August. The crew took samples every few hours around the clock, using nets of various sizes and collecting samples at various depths. New Horizon returned on Friday 21 August 2009. Miriam Goldstein, chief scientist of the SEAPLEX expedition described the findings as "shocking". Speaking about the patch, Goldstein added, "There’s no island, there’s no eighth continent, it doesn’t look like a garbage dump. It looks like beautiful ocean. But then when you put the nets in the water, you see all the little pieces".

Return
Kaisei returned to San Francisco on the morning of Monday 31 August. OVI founder and Project Kaisei co-founder Mary Crowley stated immediately following the Kaisei expeditions that the pollution was "what we expected to see, or a little worse." Andrea Neal, principal investigator on the Kaisei speaking on Tuesday 1 September stated that "Marine debris is the new man-made epidemic. It's that serious".

Initial findings from the voyages concluded that the vast majority of the debris is small. The tiny portions of the debris field was said to be pervasive, and was found both at the surface and at deeper areas. It was also described as a "nearly inconceivable amount of tiny, confettilike pieces of broken plastic", increasing in density the further they sampled into the patch. Findings suggested that the presence of small debris, of a similar size to the existent marine life, could prove an obstacle to cleanup efforts.

Larger debris found consisted of mainly plastic bottles, but also included shoe soles, plastic buckets, patio chairs, Styrofoam pieces, old toys and fishing vessel buoys, and a large collection of floating debris entangled in fishing net. Various types of marine life were found on, around and within the larger types of debris. Some of the garbage collected was put on display at the Bay Model Visitor Center in Sausalito, California.

Goal
The initial feasibility mission aimed to collect 40 tonnes of debris, using special nets designed not to catch fish, in two passes through the field. The project would later test methods of recycling the collected garbage into new plastic, or commercial products such as diesel fuel or clothing. If the initial mission proved the collection and processing technologies to be viable, it was expected that the Kaisei would lead a full scale commercial cleanup voyage with other vessels, becoming operational within 18 months.

Fundraising and recognition
Ocean Voyages Institute raised $500,000 for the Project Kaisei initial voyages. The SEAPLEX expedition cost $387,000, funded with $190,000 from UC Ship Funds, $140,000 from Project Kaisei and $57,000 from the National Science Foundation. Project Kaisei is also partnered with the California Department of Toxic Substances Control.

The group has since been recognized by the United Nations Environment Programme (UNEP) in 2009 as a Climate Hero, by Google as a Google Earth Hero for its work with a video blogging voyage tracking system, and it was recently part of the Clinton Global Initiative in September 2010.

See also 
 Earth Day
 Great Canadian Shoreline Cleanup
 Junk raft
 Kamilo Beach
 Marine conservation
 Marine debris
 National Cleanup Day
 Ocean Conservancy
 Plastic recycling
 Plastiki
 SUPER HI-CAT
 The Ocean Cleanup
 World Cleanup Day

References

External links
Project Kaisei
Ocean Voyages Institute
SEAPLEX – Scripps Environmental Accumulation of Plastic Expedition
Research Vessel New Horizon

Biological oceanography
Ocean pollution
Oceanography
Pacific Ocean
Scripps Institution of Oceanography
Pacific expeditions